Myrciaria pilosa, commonly known as  (interior cambucá) is a species of plant in the family Myrtaceae. It is endemic to the state of Ceará in the north-east of Brazil. The plant is a small tree that grows to between 1.5 and 2 metres tall, and produces edible, red, spherical fruit round 20mm in diameter. 

Research has shown that the essential oil from the leaves of this plant has potential as an antimicrobial drug to control infection by multi-resistant strains of Staphylococcus aureus.

References

pilosa
Crops originating from the Americas
Tropical fruit
Flora of South America
Endemic flora of Brazil
Fruits originating in South America
Cauliflory
Fruit trees
Berries